Bylsma or Bijlsma is a surname. Notable people with the surname include:

 Anner Bylsma (1934–2019), Dutch cellist
 Dan Bylsma (born 1970), former American hockey player and former head coach of the Pittsburgh Penguins
 John Bylsma (born 1948), Australian cyclist

See also 
 Bijlsma, the spelling more common within the Netherlands